Bontioli Reserve is a complete reserve in Burkina Faso. 

The reserve is located at 262 meters above sea level.

Bontioli Reserve is one of the wildlife sanctuaries with high biodiversity in Burkina Faso.

References

Protected areas of Burkina Faso
Bougouriba Province
Protected areas established in 1957